The Tokyo Derby (東京ダービー) is a Japanese thoroughbred horse race  on dirt for three-year-olds. It is run over a distance of 2000 meters (about 10 furlongs) at Oi Racecourse in  the Shinagawa, Tokyo in June.

It was first held in 1955, at that time named Haru-no-Kura, meaning 'The Race of Spring race meeting', with a distance of 2000 meters. In 1964, its name was changed to Tokyo Metropolis Derby. In 1966, its name was changed to Tokyo Derby.

Its distance has been changed three times. From 1955 to 1966, it was 2000 meters long, from 1967 to 1998, 2400 meters and after 1999, 2000 meters. Horses belonging to south kanto horseracing can run.

This is the second leg of triple crown race of mimami kanto horse racing following Haneda Hai.

Winners since 2001 

Flat horse races for three-year-olds
Horse races in Japan